Lioptilodes topali is a species of moth in the genus Lioptilodes known from Argentina. Moths of this species take flight in March, May and November and have a wingspan of approximately 29–32 millimetres.

References

Platyptiliini
Moths described in 1991